The 2021 European Short Track Speed Skating Championships were held from 22 to 24 January 2021 in Gdańsk, Poland.

Due to fears around the COVID-19 pandemic seven time European champion Arianna Fontana will not take part. Neither will two time European champion Elise Christie and the rest of the British team.

Medal summary

Men

Women

References

External links
Official website
Results
Results book

European Short Track Speed Skating Championships
European Championships
European Short Track Speed Skating Championships
International speed skating competitions hosted by Poland
Sports competitions in Gdańsk
European Short Track Speed Skating Championships